Anno Dracula: The Bloody Red Baron, or simply The Bloody Red Baron, is a 1995 alternate history/horror novel by British author Kim Newman. It is the second book in the Anno Dracula series and takes place during the Great War, 30 years after the first novel.

Plot
The book takes place during World War I and explores the Diogenes Club's efforts to investigate Germany's attempt to make powerful, undead fliers. Heading up the German operations are the likes of Rotwang, Doctor Caligari and Doctor Mabuse. One of their more successful efforts is an undead flier known as the Red Baron. The story also features Edgar Allan Poe as a vampire writer assigned to ghostwrite the Red Baron's autobiography.

Setting
The book is set in an alternate history universe in which Professor Van Helsing failed in his efforts to kill Count Dracula. This resulted in a vampire proliferation across the world. The book combines a large number of historical and fictional characters, as did its predecessor, Anno Dracula, and pays tribute to a great many World War I movies and novels.

Characters
The novel features numerous characters from other media, including TV and movies, as well as published novels and short stories. Some are directly named, while others are described. The following list is far from complete.

Central Powers

Fictional references
Count Dracula - Dracula by Bram Stoker
Brides of Dracula - Dracula by Bram Stoker
Paul Bäumer — All Quiet on the Western Front, anti-war novel by Erich Maria Remarque
Doctor Caligari — The Cabinet of Dr. Caligari (1920) film
Baron von Emmelman — Comic book character The Heap
Hammer - Comic book character Enemy Ace
Hardt - The Spy in Black (1939) film
General Karnstein — Carmilla by Sheridan Le Fanu
Doctor Mabuse - Norbert Jacques' literary works
Baron Meinster — The Brides of Dracula (1960) film
Doctor Orlof - The Awful Dr. Orloff (1962) film
Count Orlok - Nosferatu (1922) film
Hjalmar Poelzig — From the 1934 film The Black Cat
Robur — Robur the Conqueror by Jules Verne
Rotwang - Metropolis (1927) film
Theo Kretschmar-Schuldorff — From the film The Life and Death of Colonel Blimp
Bruno Stachel - The Blue Max (1966) film
Erich von Stalhein — Biggles series by W. E. Johns
Professor Jakob Ten Brincken — Alraune (1911) novel
Armand Tesla - The Return of the Vampire (1943) film
Lemora  - Lemora: A Child's Tale of the Supernatural (1971) film
Faustine  - Algernon Charles Swinburne published a poem of the same name
Gregory von Bayern -- The Dragon Waiting by John M. Ford
Chateau du Malinbois  - Stories of vampire-haunted Averoigne by Clark Ashton Smith
Renamed Schloß Adler (The Castle of the Eagles) - Where Eagles Dare (1968) film
Doktor Krueger - recurring villain of G8 and His Battle Aces, first appearing in The Bat Staffel (1933)

Historic figures
Oswald Boelcke
Hanns Heinz Ewers
Franz Ferdinand
Franz Joseph I of Austria
Anthony Fokker
Erich von Falkenhayn
Hermann Göring
Fritz Haarmann
Mata Hari
Paul von Hindenburg
Adolf Hitler
Max Immelmann
Franz Kafka
Peter Kürten
Béla Lugosi
Erich Ludendorff
Helmuth von Moltke
Friedrich Wilhelm Murnau
Edgar Allan Poe
Willi Sanke
Peter Strasser
Ernst Udet
Manfred von Richthofen
Lothar von Richthofen
Sophie, Duchess of Hohenberg
Kaiser Wilhelm II
Ferdinand von Zeppelin

Allies

Fictional
"Red" Albright - Captain Midnight radio show
Kent Allard - The Shadow series by Walter B. Gibson
James "Jim" Apperson - From the 1925 film The Big Parade
Doctor Arrowsmith - Arrowsmith, novel by Sinclair Lewis
Ashenden - Ashenden: Or the British Agent, novel by W. Somerset Maugham
Jake Barnes — The Sun Also Rises, novel by Ernest Hemingway
Eddie Bartlett — The Roaring Twenties film
James Bigglesworth — From the Biggles series by W. E. Johns
Lady Jennifer Buckingham — Doctor Who serial The War Games
Jerry Dandridge — Fright Night film
Clifford Chatterley — Lady Chatterley's Lover, novel by D. H. Lawrence
Caleb Croft - Grave of the Vampire (or "Seed of Terror") film
Courtney - The Dawn Patrol (1930 film)
Tom Cundall — Winged Victory, novel by Victor Maslin Yeates
Sergeant Dravot - The Man Who Would Be King by Rudyard Kipling
Bulldog Drummond - the works of H. C. McNeile
Augustus "Gussie" Fink-Nottle- the Bertie Wooster series by P. G. Wodehouse.
James Gatz (Jay Gatsby) - The Great Gatsby by F. Scott Fitzgerald
Private Charles Godfrey - From the TV series Dad's Army' '(referred to as "the Quaker stretcher-bearer, Godfrey") 
Mina Harker - Dracula by Bram Stoker
Ginger Hebblethwaite — From the Biggles series by W. E. Johns
Mycroft Holmes - From the works of Arthur Conan Doyle
Sherlock Holmes - From the works of Arthur Conan Doyle
Nick Knight - From the TV series Forever KnightKostaki — From The Pale Lady by Alexandre Dumas, père
Algernon "Algy" Lacey — From the Biggles series by W. E. Johns
Bertie Lissie — From the Biggles series by W. E. Johns; an upper-class character who wears a monocle, utters clichéd expressions, and bears some resemblance to P. G. Wodehouse's Bertie Wooster.
Cary Lockwood - From the 1931 film, The Last FlightLt. Col. Andrew Blodgett "Monk" Mayfair - One of Doc Savage's five assistants
General Mireau — From the movie Paths of GloryDoctor Moreau - From the novel The Island of Doctor Moreau by H. G. Wells
Ouran- From the 1932 film Island of Lost SoulsRoger Penderel - From the 1927 novel Benighted by J.B. Priestley
Kate Reed — A character from Dracula who was cut from the final novel
Lord Ruthven - From the short story The Vampyre by Dr. John William Polidori
Severin — From the film Near DarkGeorge Sherston - From the Sherston trilogy by Siegfried Sassoon
Count Sinestre - From the film Devils of DarknessCaptain Elliot Spencer — The original identity of Pinhead from the movie HellraiserSimon Templar - From The Saint novels and TV series.
Tietjens - Probably Christopher Tietjens from "Parade's End" by Ford Maddox Ford
Dr. Thorndyke - From the novels of R. Austin Freeman
Isolde - From the French film, "Le frisson des vampires"
Jedediah Leland - From Orson Welles's Citizen Kane
Herbert West - From the short story "Herbert West–Reanimator" by H. P. Lovecraft
Lord Peter Wimsey - From the Peter Wimsey novels of Dorothy L. Sayers (referred to as "the second son of the Duke of Denver")
Wilson - From the Biggles series of books
Clive Wynne-Candy - From the film, The Life and Death of Colonel Blimp.

Real
H. H. Asquith
Albert Ball
Thomas Beecham
Roy Brown
Edith Cavell
Winston Churchill
Arthur Rhys Davids
Douglas Haig, 1st Earl Haig
Lanoe Hawker
Sydney Horler
David Lloyd George
Edmund Gosse
Oswald Mosley
Philippe Pétain
Nicholas II of Russia
Alexei Nikolaevich, Tsarevich of Russia
Charles Nungesser
John J. Pershing
Mary Pickford
Grigori Rasputin
William Robertson
Saki
Mansfield Smith-Cumming
J. R. R. Tolkien
Hugh Trenchard
King Victor of Britain
H. G. Wells
Henry Hughes Wilson
Woodrow Wilson

Non-aligned

Fictional
Fantômas - From the works of Marcel Allain and Pierre Souvestre
Jules and Jim — From the movie Jules and JimArsène Lupin -From the works of Maurice Leblanc
Perle von Mauren — From Carl Jacobi's Revelations in BlackOliver Mellors — From the novel Lady Chatterley's LoverCharles Plumpick — From the 1966 film King of HeartsSnoopy - From Peanuts by Charles M. Schulz
Švejk — From The Good Soldier Švejk by Jaroslav Hašek
Langstrom of Gotham University/Man-Bat - Robert Kirkland (Kirk) Langstrom of DC Comics'Batman fame; an anachronism of course
Jacques Lantier - From Émile Zola's novel La Bête humaineDes Esseintes - From A rebours by Joris-Karl Huysmans
Sadie Thompson - From the eponymous 1928 film
Lola-Lola - From the 1930 German film, The Blue AngelGigi - From the French novella Gigi by Colette
Jiggs - From the 1958 American film, The Tarnished Angels''
Judex - From the 1912 silent French serial

Real
Vladimir Lenin

References

External links
Chapter One of The Bloody Red Baron
The Wold Newton Universe - The Anno Dracula Character Guide

1995 British novels
1995 fantasy novels
British alternative history novels
Crossover novels
Dracula novels
British horror novels
Vampire novels
Wold Newton family
Novels set during World War I
World War I alternate histories
Novels by Kim Newman
Fiction set in 1918
Aviation novels
Cultural depictions of Adolf Hitler
Cultural depictions of Bela Lugosi
Cultural depictions of Hermann Göring
Cultural depictions of Manfred von Richthofen
Cultural depictions of Mata Hari
Cultural depictions of Franz Kafka
Cultural depictions of Philippe Pétain
Cultural depictions of Winston Churchill
Cultural depictions of David Lloyd George
Cultural depictions of J. R. R. Tolkien
Cultural depictions of Grigori Rasputin
Cultural depictions of Wilhelm II
Cultural depictions of Edgar Allan Poe
Cultural depictions of Peter Kürten
Cultural depictions of Oswald Mosley
Cultural depictions of H. G. Wells
Cultural depictions of Nicholas II of Russia
Cultural depictions of Vladimir Lenin
Cultural depictions of Douglas Haig, 1st Earl Haig
Cultural depictions of Paul von Hindenburg
Cultural depictions of Anthony Fokker
Cultural depictions of Erich Ludendorff
Cultural depictions of Franz Joseph I of Austria
Cultural depictions of Archduke Franz Ferdinand of Austria
Carroll & Graf books